Kadoshkino (Kadaž) is an urban locality (a work settlement) and the administrative center of Kadoshkinsky District of the Republic of Mordovia, Russia. As of the 2010 Census, its population was 4,704.

History
Urban-type settlement status was granted to it in 1968.

Administrative and municipal status
Within the framework of administrative divisions, Kadoshkino serves as the administrative center of Kadoshkinsky District. As an administrative division, the work settlement of Kadoshkino, together with five rural localities, is incorporated within Kadoshkinsky District as Kadoshkino Work Settlement. As a municipal division, Kadoshkino Work Settlement is incorporated within Kadoshkinsky Municipal District as Kadoshkinskoye Urban Settlement.

References

Notes

Sources

Urban-type settlements in Mordovia
Kadoshkinsky District